Bayani Flores Fernando (born July 25, 1946) is a Filipino politician, businessman and professional mechanical engineer who served as the representative for Marikina's 1st congressional district from 2016 to 2022. The son of 3rd and 5th Marikina mayor Gil Fernando, he served as the Mayor of Marikina from 1992 to 2001, leaving the office having transformed the city from a former municipality to a model Philippine city. He was also a vice-presidential candidate for the 2010 polls.

Fernando founded the construction company BF Corporation after graduating from college in the Mapúa Institute of Technology in the late 1960s, and was its head for more than 20 years. BF Corporation was the main contractor for Rufino Pacific Tower and Edsa Shangri-La, Manila, and still continues involvement in other construction projects, notably infrastructure-related projects.

Early life and career
Bayani Fernando was born in San Juan del Monte, Rizal (now a part of Metro Manila) to Gil Fernando and Remedios Flores and finished his secondary education at the Marikina School of Arts and Trades (now Marikina Science High School). He finished college with a degree on Mechanical Engineering at the Mapúa Institute of Technology.

Political career

Mayor of Marikina (1992 – 2001)
Fernando first ran for mayor of the municipality of Marikina in 1988, finishing in fourth place among seven candidates. In 1992, he was elected mayor of Marikina. His administration as mayor transformed the former municipality into one of the best-managed cities and a paradigm of responsive and effective governance. His term saw the transformation of Marikina from a 4th class municipality to a model Philippine city accorded with 55 citations and distinctions. He was re-elected mayor twice, serving until 2001. He was succeeded by his wife, Marides Fernando.

Arroyo Administration (2002 – 2009)

MMDA Chairman (2002–2009)
In 2002, Fernando was appointed Chairman of the Metropolitan Manila Development Authority by President Gloria Macapagal Arroyo, directing him to duplicate his transformation work in Marikina, but for the entire Metro Manila. He gained polarized public reactions to his strict style of governance. 

Fernando briefly served as Secretary of the Department of Public Works and Highways (DPWH) from January 15, 2003, until April 15, 2003.

For his work as chairman, he was conferred the Doctor of Humanities, Honoris Causa, Ateneo de Cagayan, The Outstanding Filipino (TOFIL) Award for Government Service, the H.R Reyes Academic Medallion of Honor, Central Colleges of the Philippines and Doctor of the Public Administration, Honoris Causa by the Polytechnic University of the Philippines.

He is notable for introducing U-Turn slots, greatly increasing the amount of pedestrian overpasses at road intersections (called footbridges), pioneering broadcasting of the MMDA, sidewalk clearing operations, and revitalizing the assets and fleets of the government agency. Although some of his policies and structures were met with resistance and complaints, many of these can be still seen today. Subsequent MMDA chairmen continued many of BF's contribution, particularly the construction of footbridges.

2010 Vice Presidential campaign
On January 4, 2008, Fernando announced that he would be running for the presidency in the 2010 elections. Fernando hinted that he had gathered the funds and logistics required for a nationwide campaign and was intent on running for the presidency with or without the support of his party, Lakas-CMD. But on September 16, 2009, when Lakas-CMD chose Gilberto Teodoro to represent their party for the presidency, Fernando reiterated "he is keeping his options open and may possibly run as an independent candidate or bolt out of the party."

He announced his intention to run for President of the Philippines in the 2010 general elections, but after talks with Richard Gordon, he agreed to run instead as Vice-President under Gordon's newly established party, Bagumbayan. Fernando lost in the 2010 elections, placing fourth in the polls, losing to Makati mayor Jejomar Binay in fourth place.

Return to private life (2010 – 2016)
Nothing was heard from Bayani Fernando after the elections; however, he made an appearance again with then MMDA Chairman Francis Tolentino, in the issue of informal settlers and the perennial flooding crisis, defending Tolentino in the flood control issues.

On July 25, 2012, a Telephone Interview with Bayani Fernando was made by Senator Richard Gordon in a TV5 Radio Program. Bayani had been focusing on his construction and metal fabrication business at BF Corporation.

Representative for the 1st District of Marikina (2016 – 2022)

2016 Congressional Campaign
After First District representative Marcelino Teodoro was term-limited, Bayani Fernando marked his political comeback by running for representative in the 2016 elections. He defeated Councilor Samuel Ferriol and Attorney Jopet Sison in the race, garnering 54.21% of the vote.

ABS-CBN franchise renewal controversy

On July 10, 2020, Fernando is among the 70 representatives who voted "yes" to "kill" (reject) the franchise renewal of ABS-CBN, the largest Philippine television network. The hearing for the network's renewal unearthed several questionable issues, prompting Fernando's vote. He also suggested continuing investigations due to the issues found, and even probing the government agencies that were supposed to oversee compliance and operations of such networks.

Clash with Marcelino Teodoro and 2022 Marikina Mayoral Campaign

In December 2020, Marcelino Teodoro submitted a complaint to the Department of Environment and Natural Resources against BFCT, claiming that the flooding caused by the passage of Typhoon Ulysses was a result of the construction firm's land reclamation project along the Marikina River. Fernando denied the claims, commenting that the flooding was the result of the narrowing of the river and the construction of the Manalo Bridge. The department would ultimately approve Teodoro's request to remove the reclaimed land, culminating Teodoro's ouster from the Nationalist People's Coalition. Teodoro and his allies would later migrate to the United Nationalist Alliance.

Fernando would challenge Teodoro for the city's mayoralty, running under the NPC banner. His running mate was Tumana Barangay Captain Ziffred Ancheta. He ran on the platform of continuing his policies as mayor and to improve the city's infrastructure.

Fernando was defeated in his election bid, only receiving 17.51% of the vote. The congressional seat left open by his mayoral campaign was filled by Marjorie Ann Teodoro. Had Fernando been elected back to the mayoralty, he would have been the first former mayor in the city's history to do so.

Business career

BF Corporation
Later on, he established BF Corporation, an umbrella company that includes BF Construction Company and BF Metal Works. His company became involved in the construction of structures for the Mall of Asia Arena, SM City Marikina, SM City Sucat, Robinsons Galleria, Robinsons Ermita, Shangri-La Plaza, Edsa Shangri-La, Manila, and buildings in Makati's business district such as Rufino Pacific Tower and one of the Philippines' tallest, PBCom Tower.

Long after leaving MMDA, his construction company won a Public–private partnership (PPP) bid that will build classrooms and school buildings for the Department of Education.

His company was again involved in a government project, the Common Station for lines Line 1, Line 3, Line 7, and Line 9 (Metro Manila Subway), supplying steel foundations for the structure. The same company would also supply steel that would become the foundation for large span girders in the NLEX Segment 10.1 Harbor Link section.

Personal life
Fernando is married to Marides Carlos, his successor as mayor of Marikina. They have one daughter named Tala Fernando, who is married to John Paul L. Ang, who is the eldest son of Ramon Ang. Fernando is a member of the Philippine Independent Church.

See also
 Metropolitan Manila Development Authority

References

External links
 Official Website - Bayani Fernando
 Metropolitan Manila Development Authority
 - Transformers Official Website

|-

|-

1946 births
Living people
20th-century Filipino engineers
Arroyo administration cabinet members
Bagumbayan–VNP politicians
Candidates in the 2010 Philippine vice-presidential election
Chairpersons of the Metropolitan Manila Development Authority
Filipino engineers
Lakas–CMD (1991) politicians
Lakas–CMD politicians
Mapúa University alumni
Mayors of Marikina
Members of the House of Representatives of the Philippines from Marikina
Members of the Philippine Independent Church
Nationalist People's Coalition politicians
People from Marikina
People from Rizal
Reality show winners
Secretaries of Public Works and Highways of the Philippines